Relations between the European Union (EU) and the Hashemite Kingdom of Jordan are outlined by a number of agreements and close co-operation. The EU is Jordan's main trading partner.

Trade
With €2.6 billion of EU exports to Jordan in 2008, the EU is Jordan's largest trading partner and Jordan is also the EU's 58th largest destination for its exports. EU exports were mainly machinery (31.5%), transport equipment (21.3%) and chemical products (13%). EU imports from Jordan amounted to €0.3 billion and were mainly chemicals; however the Jordanian economy is primarily a service economy (75% of GDP). Jordan also benefits from considerable foreign direct investment flows and EU financial assistance (€265 million).

Agreements

Jordan's relations with the EU are within an action plan and association agreement as part of the European Neighbourhood Policy. Jordan is also a member of the EU's Union for the Mediterranean. The EU's Association Agreement with Jordan was signed on 24 November 1997. It entered into force on 1 May 2002, replacing the Co-operation Agreement of 1977. The agreement will progressively establish a free trade area between the EU and Jordan over 12 years, in conformity with WTO rules.

In November 2008, during the first meeting of the EU-Jordan Association Council in Brussels, Jordan submitted a request for an “advanced status”, under which the Kingdom would be considered more than an EU partner.  EU officials said they are holding ongoing meetings at the ministerial level in order to assess Jordan's progress on certain criteria to receive the distinction, under which the Kingdom will be eligible for socio-economic programmes previously restricted to EU members.

“This will be important, not only for Jordan but also for the EU countries. Once this step is taken, Jordan will be eligible to participate in programmes that used to be exclusive to EU member states,” Patrick Renauld, head of the European Commission (EC) Delegation in Jordan, said during a lunch with media representatives on Tuesday.

“The aim is not only to create more durable links between us, but also to start a deeper dialogue to implement joint policies, particularly in priority sectors in Jordan and the EU, especially in the energy, water and transport sectors,” Renauld said.

The European Union (EU) is expected to approve the Kingdom's request for advanced status relations with EU member states by 2011, according to EU officials.

On October 26 2011, Jordan and the European Union agreed the European Neighborhood Policy (ENP) Action Plan, under which the Kingdom enters into an “advanced status” partnership with the supranational institution.

On 6 October 2022, Jordanian Minister of Planning and International Cooperation Nasser Shraideh announced to sign an agreement with the European Investment Bank (EIB) regarding food security in Jordan worth €130 million.

External links
Embassy of Jordan - Brussels (EU)
Delegation of EU - Amman

References

 
EU
Third-country relations of the European Union